Burra Voe may refer to:

 Burra Voe, a bay on the island of Yell in the Shetland Islands
 Burravoe, a village on Yell in the Shetland Islands